I-54 or i54 may refer to:
 , the name of more than one Imperial Japanese Navy submarine
 Type B Mod. 2 submarine, a class of Imperial Japanese Navy submarine
 i54, a business park in West Midlands, United Kingdom